Aatifi (born 1965) is a contemporary Afghan-German painter, printmaker and calligrapher. He was born in Kandahar, Afghanistan. He lives and works in Bielefeld, Germany. His works contain abstracted Arabian calligraphy and modern European influences.

Biography
After graduating as a master calligrapher early, he moved to Kabul in 1982. There he finished High School, opened a workshop shortly after and built a school for drawing and calligraphy. He then entered the Kabul University's Fine Arts Faculty in 1989 to become a painter. In the same year, he was awarded the Prize for Calligraphy and Composition by the Afghan Ministry of Culture and was awarded a second time the year after. In 1991, he was awarded first place by the artists group Hakim Naser Khesraw Balkhi. In 1992, he finished his studies in Kabul. Moving to Germany in 1995, Aatifi became a member of the Sächsischer Künstlerbund and worked as a stipendiary at Moritzburg Castle in 1997. He then got recognized by painter and professor  who offered him classes in 1997/98 at Dresden Academy of Fine Arts. In the late 1990s Aatifi moved to Bielefeld where he set up his studio to work and to create art to the present day.

Solo Exhibition at Museum für Islamische Kunst in the Pergamon Museum Berlin (2015)
Invited by director Stefan Weber Aatifi curated an exhibition in the Museum für Islamische Kunst in the Pergamon Museum Berlin in 2015 titled 'Aatifi - News from Afghanistan'. Specialised in preserving and presenting ancient Islamic art, Weber's decision to implement contemporary paintings on a large scale in the museum for the first time was based on Aatifi's approach towards calligraphy. 'Aatifi comes from a living tradition, which also distinguishes him from a number of contemporary artists [ ... ]. The strengths of the tradition - i.e. the foundations of classical aesthetics in calligraphy - are not always known, nor is the freedom of distancing oneself from these understood. That's why poor imitations of cultural archetypes are produced. Not so with Aatifi. Aatifi pulls off the balancing act [ ... ].'

Work and techniques
Aatifis works can be described as a form of highly stylized appropriation of written language. Coming from the tradition of classic Arabian calligraphy however, he tried to reduce the evidence of perceivable language even further to the point of him using the bare shapes of his source material for the intricacy of the composition. Using acrylics, chalk, ink, charcoal, and metal to establish a wide range of intercepted and connected spaces. In his figurative and abstract works Aatifi also turns to printmaking in various techniques, which he first got in contact with when living in Dresden. His colour palette is a representation of his experiences in Afghanistan and Germany, but is also based on his travels around the world. In 2016, Aatifi has included works in collage technique to his oeuvre.

Works in museums and private collections
 Museum für Islamische Kunst in the Pergamon Museum Berlin/Berlin State Museums/Prussian Cultural Heritage Foundation
 Kupferstich-Kabinett/State Art Collections Dresden
 Municipal Art Collection Radebeul
 Federal Centre of Culture Salzau
 The Collection of the Kunstverein Zwickau e. V.
 Municipal Art Collection Zwickau

Exhibitions
 2020: 'Written Imagery', Aatifi, Dagmar Buhr, Herta Müller, Babak Saed, Elizabeth Thallauer, Neue Galerie Dachau , Dachau, Group Show
 2020: paper positions Berlin / Positions, Galerie VON & VON (Nürnberg), Berlin, Group Show
 2019: 'Aatifi – Alphabet der Malerei', Herforder Kunstverein, Herford, Solo Show
 2018: 'Hier und Jetzt – Aktuelle Kunst in Westfalen', Gustav-Lübcke-Museum, Hamm, Group Show 
 2018: paper positions Basel, Galerie VON & VON (Nürnberg), Basel, Schweiz, Group Show 
 2017: POSITIONS Berlin Art Fair, Galerie VON & VON (Nürnberg), Berlin, Group Show 
 2017: 'Aatifi – Neographie', TKA Art Advisors, Hamburg, Solo Show
 2017: 'Aatifi – Abstrakte Neographie', Internationaler Club im Auswärtigen Amt e. V., Berlin
 2017: SimonBart Gallery, Sardinien, Italy, Group Show 
 2017: 'Aatifi', Galerie VON & VON, Nürnberg, Solo Show
 2017: DIE GROSSE NRW, Museum Kunstpalast, Düsseldorf, Group Show
 2015: 'Aatifi – News from Afghanistan', Museum für Islamische Kunst in the Pergamon Museum Berlin, Solo Show
 2015: 'Aatifi – Prozess III', Museum Ratingen, Ratingen, Solo Show
 2012: 'Ereignis Druckgraphik 4: Ansichten – Aussichten', Galerie Vor Ort Ost, Leipzig, Group Show
 2011: 'METAKOM', Kunstverein Kreis Gütersloh, Gütersloh, Group Show
 2009: 'Aatifi – Skripturale Fragmente', Galerie im Torhaus, Federal Centre of Culture Salzau, Salzau, Solo Show
 2006: 'Contemporary Art Kabul', art Karlsruhe, Karlsruhe, Group Show
 2005: 'Aatifi – Tanz am frühen Morgen', City Gallery Radebeul, Radebeul, Solo Show
 1990: 'Aatifi', Ministry of Culture, Kabul, Afghanistan, Solo Show
 1989: 'Aatifi', Kabul University, Kabul, Afghanistan, Solo Show

Awards and stipends
 2018: Rekognition price of Stadt Hamm, Hier und Jetzt – Aktuelle Kunst in Westfalen', Gustav-Lübcke-Museum, Hamm
 2017: Stipend at Aldegrever Gesellschaft, Münster
 2012: 5th Collotype Printing Symposium Lepizig, Leipzig
 2012: International Graphic Arts Symposium Zwickau, Zebra 5, Kunstverein Zwickau
 2009: Stipend at the Federal Centre of Culture Schleswig-Holstein, Salzau
 2008: Stipend at the 18th Saxony Graphic Arts Symposium, Leipzig
 2001: Stipend at Künstlerhaus Schwalenberg, Schwalenberg
 1997: Stipend at Schloss Moritzburg, Moritzburg
 1991: 1st Prize by the Afghan Artist Group Hakim Naser Khesraw Balkhi
 1990: 1st Prize by the Afghan Ministry of Culture
 1989: 1st Prize by the Afghan Ministry of Culture

Bibliography
 Kunibert Bering, Rolf Niehoff: Horizont 1, Bilder der Gegenwart – Globalisierung und Migration. In: Horizonte der Bild-Kunst-Geschichte, Part 1, 1st edition, Athena-Verlag, Oberhausen 2018.
 Julia Thieke: Zwischen Lapislazuli und Lithium. Künstlerportrait Aatifi. In: Kunst & Material [magazine], 2016.
 Martina Bauer (Ed.): Aatifi – News from Afghanistan [exhibition catalogue], Kerber Verlag, 2015.
 Kunstverein Zwickau e.V. (Ed.): Internationales Grafiksymposium Zwickau Zebra 5. [exhibition catalogue] 2013.
 The Graphic Arts Museum of Schreiner Foundation (Ed.): Von Kaiserblau bis Luxusschwarz. [exhibition catalogue] Verlag Grafik Museum Stiftung Schreiner, 2011.
 Friederike Schir, Reiner Kuhn, Manuel Schroeder, Inga Schubert-Hartmann (Eds.): Metakom. [exhibition catalogue], Kettler, 2011.

See also 
 List of Afghan artists

References

Further reading

External links
 Offical website
 Exhibition details about 'Aatifi - News from Afghanistan' on the website of the Museum für Islamische Kunst
 Elke Vogel, fünf Ausstellungstipps der Woche',  art Das Kunstmagazin, online-edition, 2. Juli 2015

Afghan artists
German painters
German calligraphers
German printmakers
1965 births
Living people